The 2002 Michigan House of Representatives elections were held on November 5, 2002, with partisan primaries to select the parties' nominees in the various districts on August 6, 2002.

Results

Districts 1-28

Districts 29-55

Districts 56-83

Districts 84-110

See also
Michigan Senate election, 2002

References

House of Representatives
2002
Michigan House of Representatives
November 2002 events in the United States